Hyundai Transys is an affiliate company of Hyundai Motor Group and produces a number of automobile transmissions, axles and seats in-house.

On January 1, 2019, Hyundai DYMOS and Hyundai Powertech were merged with Hyundai Transys.

Hyundai Powertech was established in 2001 as South Korea's first automatic transmission specialist. It has plants in South Korea, China, and the United States. Its automatic transmissions are used in Hyundai, Kia, Dodge, and Jeep vehicles.

Hyundai DYMOS produces MT based transmissions including DCT and AMT along with axles, 4WD and seats as automotive parts.

Automatic Transmission (AT)

Front wheel

4-speed automatic

A4F12/A4CF0 

A4F16/A4CF1 

A4F23/A4CF2 

5-speed automatic

A5F16 

A5F23/A5GF1 

A5HF1 

Rated up to

6-speed automatic

A6F17 

A6F18 

A6F22/A6GF1 

A6F24/A6MF1 
It is contracted by Chrysler Group LLC for use in 2013–2016 Dodge Dart and 2014-2016 Jeep Compass and Jeep Patriot, the transmission is designed to be maintenance-free under normal use and is assembled in South Korea.

A6F27/A6MF2 

A6F28H/A6FMH/A6MF2H 

A6F30 

A6F33/A6LF1 

A6F36/A6LF2 

A6LF3 

8-speed automatic

A8F27/A8MF1 

A8F36/A8LF1 

A8F42/A8LF2 

A8FLH 

Rear wheel

5-speed automatic

A5R25 

A5R35/A5SR1 

A5R45/A5SR2 

8-speed automatic

A8R40/A8LR1 

A8R50/A8TR1 

Continuously Variable Transmission (CVT)

Kappa CVT 

Gamma CVT CF18/C0GF1 

CF28 

Dual Clutch Transmission (DCT)

6-speed dual clutch

D6GF1 
This transmission uses dry clutch.

D6KF1/D6F27H 
This transmission uses dry clutch.

7-speed dual clutch

D7GF1/D7F22 
This transmission uses dry clutch.

D7UF1/D7F34 
This transmission uses dry clutch.

8-speed dual clutch

D8LF1/D8F48W 
This transmission uses wet clutch.

Automated Manual Transmission (AMT)

5-Speed AMT

S5F13 

Manual Transmission (MT)

Front Wheel

5-speed manual

M5EF2/M5F13 
Rated up to  while having a dry weight of

M5AF3/M5F14 
Rated up to  while having a dry weight of

M5CF1/M5F16 
Rated up to  while having a dry weight of

M5BF2/M5CF2/M5F19 
Rated up to  while having a dry weight of

M5GF1/M5F25 
Rated up to  while having a dry weight of

M5GF2 
Rated up to

M5HF2 
Rated up to

6-speed manual

M6CF1/M6F17 
Rated up to  while having a dry weight of

M6CF3/M6F28-1 
Rated up to  while having a dry weight of

M6CF4/M6F28-2 
Rated up to  while having a dry weight of

M6GF2

M6LF1/M6F44 
Rated up to  while having a dry weight of

Rear Wheel

5-speed manual

M5R18 
Rated up to  while having a dry weight of

M5R23 
Rated up to  while having a dry weight of

M5R26 
Rated up to  while having a dry weight of

M5R32 
Rated up to  while having a dry weight of

M5R36 
Rated up to  while having a dry weight of

6-speed manual

M6R26 
Rated up to  while having a dry weight of

M6R34 
Rated up to  while having a dry weight of

M6R37 
Rated up to  while having a dry weight of

M6R40 

Reduction Gear

Shift by Cable (SBC)

G1F24 

G1F30 

G1F36 

Shift by Wire (SBW)

G1F23

G1F24 

G1F25

G1F26 

G1F28

G1F30

G1F32 

G1F35

G1R35

G1F40

G1R40

External links

 Hyundai Transys

References

Hyundai
transmissions